Kulotino is an urban locality (a work settlement) in Okulovsky District of Novgorod Oblast, Russia, located on the Peretna River a few kilometers northeast of the town of Okulovka. Municipally, along with seventeen rural localities, it is incorporated as Kulotinskoye Urban Settlement in Okulovsky Municipal District, one of the three urban settlements in the district. Population:

History
In 1882, a textile factory was built, which was the foundation of Kulotino. The factory was located close to the selo of Polishchi. In the beginning of the 20th century, Kulotino was a village in Okulovskaya Volost of Krestetsky Uyezd (1918–1927 Malovishersky Uyezd) of Novgorod Governorate. On August 1, 1927, the uyezds were abolished and Kulotino was transferred to newly established Okulovsky District. Novgorod Governorate was abolished as well, and the district became a part of Borovichi Okrug of Leningrad Oblast. In the end of 1927, Polishchsky Selsoviet was renamed Kulotinsky Selsoviet, and on June 25, 1928, Kulotino was granted urban-type settlement status. On July 23, 1930, the okrugs were abolished, and the districts were directly subordinated to the oblast. On July 5, 1944, Okulovsky District was transferred to newly established Novgorod Oblast and remained there ever since.

Economy

Industry
Kulotino was founded as a settlement around the textile factory. The factory was defunct as of 2011.

Transportation
Kulotino is a railway station on the line connecting Okulovka and Nebolchi. As of 2011, there was one suburban train per day calling at Kulotino. The settlement is also connected by road with Okulovka.

Culture and recreation
In Kulotino, there are four cultural heritage monuments of local significance. Two of them are archaeological sites, and two are the graves of the soldiers fallen in World War II. Kulotino was not occupied during the war but was for an extensive period located close to the front line.

References

Notes

Sources

External links

Urban-type settlements in Novgorod Oblast
Krestetsky Uyezd